The following is a list of notable deaths in February 2002.

Entries for each day are listed alphabetically by surname. A typical entry lists information in the following sequence:
 Name, age, country of citizenship at birth, subsequent country of citizenship (if applicable), reason for notability, cause of death (if known), and reference.

February 2002

1
Raymond Crapet, 75, French Olympic sprinter (men's 400 metres at the 1948 Summer Olympics).
Streamline Ewing, 85, American jazz trombonist, worked with Louis Armstrong, Lionel Hampton, Jimmie Lunceford, Cab Calloway.
Orlando Sierra Hernández, 42, Colombian columnist and newspaper director, shot.
Hildegard Knef, 76, German actress and singer.
Irish McCalla, 73, American actress (Sheena, Queen of the Jungle) and artist, stroke and complications from brain tumor.
Daniel Pearl, 38, American journalist, beheaded.
Robert Granville Stone, 94, American philatelic scholar.

2
Paul Baloff, 41, Exodus vocalist, heart failure.
Claude Brown, 64, American author, known for his 1965 Harlem memoir Manchild in the Promised Land.
Gerry Dialungana, 51, Musician from the Democratic Republic of the Congo (DRC).
Hugo O. Engelmann, 84, American sociologist and anthropologist.
Andy Hansen, 77, American baseball player (New York Giants, Philadelphia Phillies).
Ian Clark Hutchison, 99, British politician.
Ed Jucker, 85, American basketball coach (1961 and 1962 NCAA titles at Cincinnati) and baseball coach, prostate cancer.
Robin Medforth-Mills, 59, British professor of geography.
Ani Pachen, 68, Tibetan freedom fighter, activist and author, known as Tibet's "warrior nun".
Remo Palmier, 78, American jazz guitarist (Coleman Hawkins, Charlie Parker, Billie Holiday).
Oscar Reutersvärd, 86, Swedish graphic artist.

3
James Blackwood, 82, American Gospel singer (The Blackwood Brothers), nominated for thirty-one and won nine Grammy Awards.
Edward Thomas Chapman, 82, Welsh World War II British Army corporal and recipient of the Victoria Cross.
Bill Epton, 70, American Maoist activist, first person convicted of criminal anarchy since the Red Scare of 1919.
Rudolf Fleischmann, 98, German nuclear physicist.
András Rapcsák, 58, Hungarian engineer and politician.
Donald Erwin Wilson, 69, American United States Navy rear admiral.

4
Abie Ames, 83, American blues and jazz pianist.
Agatha Barbara, 78, Maltese politician, having served as a Labour House of Representatives of Member of Parliament and Minister.
Count Sigvard Bernadotte of Wisborg, 94, Swedish prince.
Frederick J. Clarke, 86, military engineer with the US Army Corps of Engineers.
Tom Connors, 67, British cancer research scientist, known as one of the world's leading authorities on cancer research.
Bhagwan Dada, 88, Indian actor and film director, heart attack.
Ralph Fritz, 84, American professional football player (University of Michigan, Philadelphia Eagles).
Bert Head, 85, English football player and manager.
George Nader, 80, American actor (Six Bridges to Cross, Lady Godiva of Coventry, Sins of Jezebel), cardiopulmonary failure, pneumonia, and multiple cerebral infarctions.
Broderick Thompson, 41, American football player (Kansas, San Diego Chargers), motorcycle accident.
Baxter Ward, 82, American television news anchor and two-term member of Los Angeles County Board of Supervisors.

5
Mushtak Ali Kazi, 84, Pakistani jurist and writer, cardiac arrest.
Kauko Lusenius, 83, Finnish Olympic middle-distance runner (men's 3000 metres steeplechase at the 1952 Summer Olympics).
Raymond Martorano, 74, Italian-American mobster, shot.
Annalee Whitmore Fadiman, 85, American screenwriter (Andy Hardy Meets Debutante, Babes in Arms) and World War II foreign correspondent.
Evelyn Witthoff, 89, American missionary.

6
Osman Bölükbaşı, Turkish politician and political party leader, respiratory failure.
Angela D'Audney, 57, New Zealand television news anchor and actress, brain tumor.
Eken Mine, 66, Japanese voice actor.
Max Perutz, 87, Austrian-born British molecular biologist, and co-winner of the 1962 Nobel Prize for Chemistry.
Guy Stockwell, 68, American actor (Adventures in Paradise, Beau Geste, The Richard Boone Show), complications from diabetes.
Samuel Lucien Terrien, 90, French-American Protestant theologian and biblical scholar.

7
Elisa Bridges, 28, American actress and model, Playboy magazine's Playmate of the Month for December 1994.
Ellen Demming, 79, American actress (The Guiding Light).
Jack Fairman, 88, British Formula One driver.
David Gibson-Watt, Baron Gibson-Watt, 83, British politician.
John Taylor, Baron Ingrow, 84, British businessman.

8
Nick Brignola, 65, American jazz saxophonist.
William T. Dillard, 87, American retailer (Dillard's Department Stores).
Maurice Foley, 76, British politician (Member of Parliament for West Bromwich).
Joachim Hoffmann, 71, German historian.
Elisabeth Mann Borgese, 83, German-Canadian environmentalist, political scientist and writer.
Lloyd Kiva New, 85, American Cherokee artist and designer, and a co-founder of the Institute of American Indian Arts in Santa Fe, New Mexico.
Ong Teng Cheong, 66, Singaporean politician and fifth President of Singapore (Singapore's first directly elected president) from 1993 to 1999.
David Pyle, 65, English footballer.
Esther Afua Ocloo, 82, Ghanaian entrepreneur and pioneer of microlending, pneumonia.
Steve Roser, 84, American baseball player (New York Yankees, Boston Braves).
Eldon Rudd, 81, American politician.
Henry Williams Jr., 85, American professional golfer, played on the PGA Tour in the 1950s and 1960s.
Bob Wooler, 76, British disc jockey, known for being instrumental in introducing The Beatles to their future manager, Brian Epstein.

9
Fred Gehrke, 83, American football player (Los Angeles Rams) and executive (Denver Broncos).
John Ingvar Lövgren, 71, Swedish serial killer and rapist.
Judson Pratt, 85, American character actor.
Vesta M. Roy, 76, American politician.
Princess Margaret, Countess of Snowdon, 71, British royal and sister of Queen Elizabeth II.
Elisabeth Luce Moore, 98, American philanthropist and educator.
Ale Ahmad Suroor, 90, Indian poet and critic.
Peggy Taylor, 74, American singer and radio announcer.
Bulelani Vukwana, South African spree killer.
Barron Winchester, 69, American actor.

10
Jack Abbott, 58, American criminal and author (In the Belly of the Beast).
Chet Clemens, 84, American baseball player (Boston Bees/Braves).
John Erickson, 72, British historian, a leading authority on the Soviet Union and Russia.
Ramón Arellano Félix, 37, Mexican drug trafficker.
Traudl Junge, 81, German secretary who took Adolf Hitler's last will and testament (Blind Spot: Hitler's Secretary).
Jim Spencer, 54, American baseball player (California Angels, Texas Rangers, Chicago White Sox, New York Yankees, Oakland Athletics).
Dave Van Ronk, 65, American folk singer, and an important figure in New York City's Greenwich Village scene in the 1960s.
Vernon A. Walters, 85, American U.S. Army officer and diplomat (Deputy Director of the C.I.A., U.S. Ambassador to the United Nations).

11
Mary Brooks, 94, American director of the United States Mint from 1969 to 1977.
Ralph Buchsbaum, 95, American zoologist, invertebrate biologist, ecologist and author (Animals Without Backbones).
Frankie Crosetti, 91, American baseball player (New York Yankees) and coach (New York Yankees, Seattle Pilots, Minnesota Twins).
Barry Foster, 74, British actor, heart attack.
George A. Kasem, 82, American politician (U.S. Representative for California's 25th congressional district).
Les Peden, 78, American baseball player (Washington Senators).
Victor Posner, 83, American businessman, tycoon and corporate raider, known as a pioneer of the leveraged buyout.
Gaetano Stammati, 93, Italian politician.
Frans Van Coetsem, 82, Belgian linguist.

12
Barbara May Cameron, 47, American human rights activist in the fields of gay women, women's rights and Native American rights.
William Lee Dwyer, 72, American federal judge (U.S. District Judge of the U.S. District Court for the Western District of Washington).
George Eiferman, 76, American bodybuilder, won Mr.Universe in 1962.
John Eriksen, 44, Danish footballer.
Margaret Traxler, 77, American Religious Sister and women's rights activist.

13
Theresa Bernstein, 111, Polish-American artist.
George Bray, 83, English footballer.
Isabella Cannon, 97, Scottish-American mayor of Raleigh, North Carolina.
Ramón Grosso, 58, Spanish footballer, cancer.
Waylon Jennings, 64, American country music performer, actor, disc jockey, former member of Buddy Holly's band.
Dick Kleiner, 80, American Broadway and Hollywood columnist, his column appeared in hundreds of papers.
Edmar Mednis, 64, American chess grandmaster, complications from pneumonia.
Nikolay Soltys, 27, Ukrainian fugitive, wanted by the FBI, suicide by hanging.
Thomas J. H. Trapnell, 99, American U.S. Army lieutenant general (survived Bataan Death March).
Pauline Trigère, 93, French-born American fashion designer, her award-winning styles reached their height of popularity during the 1950s and 1960s.
Sidney Weighell, 79, British footballer, trade unionist and the General Secretary of the National Union of Railwaymen.

14
J. Desmond Clark, 85, British-American archeologist, anthropologist and author, known as an expert on the prehistory of Africa.
Gene Cook, 70, American professional football player (Detroit Lions), minor league baseball executive and elected official in Toledo, Ohio.
Norman Davidson, 85, American molecular biologist, a major figure in advancing genome research.
Geneviève de Gaulle-Anthonioz, 81, member of the French Resistance during WW II.
Nándor Hidegkuti, 79, Hungarian football player and manager (gold medal winner in Football at the 1952 Summer Olympics).
A. J. Kardar, 75, Pakistani film director, producer and screenwriter.
Grover Krantz, 70, American anthropologist and cryptozoologist, known as a Bigfoot researcher, pancreatic cancer.
Bud Olson, 76, Canadian politician, Lieutenant Governor of Alberta.
Mick Tucker, 54, English drummer for the glam rock band Sweet.
Günter Wand, 90, German orchestra conductor, directed orchestras in Hamburg and Cologne and appeared with the Chicago Symphony Orchestra.

15
Mike Darr, 25, American baseball player (San Diego Padres), car accident.
Lucille Lund, 88, American film actress, known for her role in The Black Cat, a 1934 horror classic starring Boris Karloff and Bela Lugosi.
Howard K. Smith, 87, American television anchorman and political commentator, and one of the war correspondents known as the Murrow Boys.
Kevin Smith, 38, New Zealand actor, played Ares on Hercules: The Legendary Journeys, Xena: Warrior Princess and Young Hercules.
Garry Weston, 74, Canadian businessman (Associated British Foods).

16
Tommy Crutcher, 60, American professional football player (TCU, Green Bay Packers).
Sidney De Haan, 83, British businessman (Saga), transformed the tourist industry by catering to people 50 and over.
Carol Fenner, 72, American children's book author (Yolonda's Genius).
John W. Gardner, 89, American public servant, U.S. Secretary of H.E.W. and founder of Common Cause, known as "the father of campaign finance reform".
Sir Arthur Hetherington, 90, British businessman.
Walter Winterbottom, 88, British football manager, first full-time manager of the England football team.
Peter Voulkos, 78, American ceramist, heart attack.

17
Anthony Benjamin, 70, English painter and sculptor.
Ross Dowson, 84, Canadian Trotskyist politician.
Paterson Ewen, 76, Canadian painter and sculptor, known for his cosmological images.
Alvin Radkowsky, 86, American nuclear physicist.
C. H. Prahlada Rao, 79, Indian writer and journalist.

18
Giustino Durano, 78, Italian actor (Life Is Beautiful).
Lev Kulidzhanov, 77, Soviet film director and screenwriter.
Jack Lambert, 81, American actor.
Mohammed Dabo Lere, Nigerian politician.
Gabriel Mariano, 73, Cape Verdean writer.
Byrne Piven, 72, American actor (Being John Malkovich, Miracle on 34th Street, Very Bad Things), co-founder of the Playwrights Theatre Club, lung cancer.

19
Sal Bartolo, 84, American boxer and WBA featherweight champion from March 1944 through May 1946.
Michael Anthony Crisfield, 59, British mathematician, a leading figure in applying non-linear computational mechanics to predict structural performance.
Virginia Hamilton, 67, American children's book author.
Swede Hanson, 68, American professional wrestler.
Vivien Law, 47, British linguist and academic, cancer.
Sylvia Rivera, 50, American gay liberation and transgender activist, liver cancer.
Gene Ruggiero, 91, American film editor.
William Davis Taylor, 93, American newspaper executive and publisher of The Boston Globe from 1955 to 1978.

20
Laura duPont, 52, American tennis player, 1977 U.S. Clay Court Champion.
Branko Stanković, 80,  Bosnian Serb footballer and manager.
Fredric Steinkamp, 73, American film editor (Grand Prix, Tootsie, Out of Africa), Oscar winner (1967).
Willie Thrower, 71, American football quarterback (Michigan State, Chicago Bears), heart attack.

21
A. L. Barker, 83, British author, winner of the 1947 Somerset Maugham Prize, with her collection of short stories titled Innocents.
Laudomia Bonanni, 94, Italian writer and journalist.
Roden Cutler, 85, Australian diplomat and Governor of New South Wales.
Bill Faul, 61, American baseball player (Detroit Tigers, Chicago Cubs, San Francisco Giants).
Harold Fürth, 72, Austrian-American physicist and a leader in controlled fusion research.
Trevor Hampton, 89, British diver.
John Thaw, 60, British actor (Inspector Morse, The Sweeney, Kavanagh QC), cancer.
Harold Weisberg, 88, American civil servant, investigative reporter and author, known for his prolific writings on the murders of JFK and MLK.
William H. Wynn, 70, American union leader, president of the United Food and Commercial Workers Int'l and Retail Clerks Int'l.

22
Vyacheslav Dryagin, 61, Soviet Olympic skier (Winter Olympics men's Nordic combined: 1964, 1968, 1972).
Sir Raymond Firth, 100, British anthropologist.
Edwin F. Hunter, 91, American judge (United States district judge of the United States District Court for the Western District of Louisiana).
David James, 80, Welsh cricketer.
Chuck Jones, 89, American animator, creator of Wile E. Coyote and the Road Runner, heart failure.
Brendan O'Dowda, 76, Irish tenor.
Jonas Savimbi, 67, Angolan revolutionary, leader of UNITA, multiple gunshot wounds.

23
Antonio Calebotta, 71, Italian Olympic basketball player (men's basketball at the 1960 Summer Olympics).
Franz Elbern, 91, German footballer.
Peaches Jackson, 88, American film actress.
Gordon Matthews, 65, American inventor and businessman, considered the father of "voice mail", complications relating to a stroke.

24
Martin Esslin, 83, Hungarian-born British producer, dramatist, and journalist, wrote The Theatre of the Absurd in 1962.
David Hawkins, 88, American philosopher and historian of the Manhattan Project.
Stanislav Libenský, 80, Czech contemperary artist.
Arthur Lyman, 70, American jazz vibraphone and marimba player ("Yellow Bird").
Leo Ornstein, 106, American experimental composer and pianist.
Robert Strausz-Hupé, 98, American diplomat (U.S. Ambassador to: Sri Lanka, Belgium, Sweden, NATO, Turkey).
Hela Yungst, 52, Israeli-American actress (Guiding Light, All My Children) and beauty pageant winner (Miss New Jersey 1970).

25
Clint Alberta, 32, Canadian filmmaker, suicide.
Clive L. DuVal II, 89, American politician and lawyer, cancer.
Albert Huffstickler, 74, American poet.
Afaq Hussain, 62, Pakistani cricketer.
Ken Simmons, 72, British ornithologist.

26
L. Balaraman, 70, Indian politician, MP (1984–1991, 1996–1998).
Helen Megaw, 94, Irish crystallographer.
Dinora Pines, 83, British physician and psychoanalyst.
Oskar Sala, 91, German physicist, composer and a pioneer of electronic music (The Birds).
Lawrence Tierney, 82, American actor (Dillinger, The Greatest Show on Earth, Reservoir Dogs), pneumonia.
Tony Young, 64, American actor (Gunslinger, General Hospital, Star Trek).

27
Warren Harding, 77, American rock climber.
Thomas Kallampally, 48, Indian politician and educator.
Spike Milligan, 83, Irish actor, comedian and writer (The Goon Show).
Dykes Potter, 91, American baseball player (Brooklyn Dodgers).
Surajit Chandra Sinha, Indian anthropologist.

28
Janice Cooper, 62, Australian Olympic high jumper (women's high jump at the 1956 Summer Olympics).
Ehsan Jafri, Indian politician, killed by a  mob.
Gabriel Mariano, 73, Cape Verdean poet, novelist, and an essayist.
Mary Stuart, 75, American actress (Search for Tomorrow).
John Russell Taylor, 84, Canadian politician and a member of Parliament (House of Commons representing Vancouver—Burrard, British Columbia).
Helmut Zacharias, 82, German violinist and composer.

References 

2002-02
 02